Miami Vice is an American police procedural television series which was broadcast for five seasons on the National Broadcasting Company (NBC) between 1984 and 1990. Starring Philip Michael Thomas, Don Johnson, Edward James Olmos, Olivia Brown, Saundra Santiago, John Diehl and Michael Talbott, it focuses on the lives of two undercover Metro-Dade police officers, Ricardo Tubbs (Thomas) and James "Sonny" Crockett (Johnson). The series was created by Anthony Yerkovich, with Michael Mann and Dick Wolf serving as executive producers.

Since its debut, Miami Vice has received several award nominations, including twenty at the Emmy Awards, seven at the Golden Globe Awards, two People's Choice Awards and two Grammy Awards. Although lead actor Philip Michael Thomas coined the phrase "EGOT" for his ambitions to win Emmy, Grammy, Oscar and Tony Awards, only Johnson and Olmos won acting awards for their work on the series, while composer Jan Hammer earned two Grammy awards for his composition for the show's opening credits, "Miami Vice Theme". Of a total of thirty-three nominations earned by the series, it went on to win ten awards.

The series also spawned several successful soundtrack albums, with both Miami Vice and Miami Vice II charting in several countries worldwide; however Miami Vice III saw little success. Singles from these albums, including Jan Hammer's "Miami Vice Theme" and "Crockett's Theme", and Glenn Frey's "You Belong to the City", also performed well, although later singles by acts including Sheena Easton, Yello and The Hooters did not match the popularity of earlier releases.

Directors Guild of America Awards
Director Paul Michael Glaser received a Directors Guild of America Award nomination for his work on the first-season episode "Smuggler's Blues". Glaser lost the award to Will Mackenzie, for his direction of the Moonlighting episode "My Fair David".

Edgar Awards
Series creator Anthony Yerkovich received an Edgar Award nomination for Best Episode in a TV Series, for his script to the pilot episode "Brother's Keeper". Yerkovich lost the award to Peter S. Fischer, for his Murder, She Wrote episode "Deadly Lady".

Emmy Awards
Miami Vice was the recipient of twenty Emmy Award nominations, winning four of these. Fifteen of these nominations, and all four wins, were received during the 37th Primetime Emmy Awards in 1985. Edward James Olmos earned a Primetime Emmy Award for Outstanding Supporting Actor in a Drama Series, alongside an Outstanding Cinematography for a Series award for Bob Collins, while the series also won ensemble awards for Outstanding Art Direction for a Series and Outstanding Film Sound Editing for a Series in that same year.

Jan Hammer's music for the series was honored with nominations in both 1985 and 1986, losing to Murder, She Wrote John Addison and Scarecrow and Mrs. King Arthur B. Rubinstein respectively. Lead actor Don Johnson received a 1985 nomination for Outstanding Lead Actor in a Drama Series for his role as James "Sonny" Crockett, losing to St. Elsewhere William Daniels, for his portrayal of Mark Craig. Directors Lee H. Katzin and Paul Michael Glaser both vied for 1985's Outstanding Directing for a Drama Series award, which was ultimately won by Karen Arthur for her work on Cagney & Lacey.

Golden Globe Awards
Miami Vice received seven Golden Globe Award nominations during its tenure, winning two of these. Olmos and Johnson won Best Supporting Actor and Best Actor awards respectively in 1985, with Johnson defeating co-star Philip Michael Thomas for the award. Thomas' nomination was to be the only one for his Miami Vice work, although the actor had earlier coined the phrase "EGOT" to describe his ambitions to win Emmy, Grammy, Oscar and Tony Awards in his career. Only Olmos and Hammer won any of these awards, earning an Emmy and a Grammy respectively.

Johnson and Olmos each received a further nomination in their respective categories, with Johnson losing a 1986 nomination to Edward Woodward as The Equalizer Robert McCall; and Olmos missing out on the 1988 award to both John Gielgud and Barry Bostwick for their work on the miniseries War and Remembrance. The series as a whole was nominated for the Best Television Series – Drama award twice, losing to Murder, She Wrote in 1985 and L.A. Law in 1986.

Grammy Awards
Series composer Hammer won two Grammy Awards at the 28th Grammy Awards ceremony. His composition "Miami Vice Theme", used during the series' opening credits sequence, earned him both the Best Pop Instrumental Performance and  Best Instrumental Composition awards.

Music charts

A number of soundtrack albums were released during the series' run. Of these, both Miami Vice and Miami Vice II have placed in a number of sales charts. Miami Vice, released on October 26, 1985, reached the top of the Billboard 200 chart in the United States, while several of its singles also found a degree of success. The follow-up compilation Miami Vice II, released on December 29, 1986, reached a peak position of 82 on the Billboard 200, also spawning several charting singles. The albums were also popular globally, reaching top ten positions in New Zealand, Austria, the Netherlands, and Switzerland.

Hammer's "Miami Vice Theme" reached number one on the United States' Billboard Hot 100 singles chart, while "Crockett's Theme" was successful in both the UK Singles Chart, reaching number two, and the Dutch Top 40, reaching number one. Glenn Frey also released several singles featured in the series, with "Smuggler's Blues" reaching a peak of 22 in the UK Singles Charts, and "You Belong to the City" peaking at number two on the American Adult Contemporary chart.

Albums

Singles

People's Choice Awards
Miami Vice won two People's Choice Awards, earning the award for Favorite New TV Dramatic Program at the 1985 ceremony, and following this up with a win for Favorite TV Dramatic Program the following year.

Footnotes

Lists of awards by television series
Miami Vice